Sandi is a town and a nagar palika parishad in Bilgram tehsil of Hardoi district, Uttar Pradesh, India. It is located on the left bank of the Garra river, on the road from Hardoi to Fatehgarh. As of 2011, its population is 26,007, in 4,396 households.

Geography
It has an average elevation of 175 metres (439 feet).

History
The name "Sandi" is said to be derived from the name Santan Dih or Santan Khera, which it received after Raja Santan Singh, a Sombansi king said to have ruled here until 1398, when he was defeated by Muslim conquerors and fled to Kumaon. His fort, whose ruins still exist to the south of the modern town, had a deep moat, and the besieging Muslim army had little success until they dug a channel from the moat to the Garra. The Muslims at first built a town southeast of Santan Khera, called Fatehpur Islamabad, but 22 years later it was abandoned due to disease and the site of Santan Khera was reoccupied. It was officially renamed Ashrafabad, but the name never caught on and instead it was called Santan Dih or Sandi.

Around the turn of the 20th century, the main mahallas were Saiyidwara, Salamullahganj, Munshiganj, Khalisa, Auladganj, Nawabganj, and Uncha Tila. Uncha Tila was the site of an earthwork fortification built by Shuja-ud-Daula in the 1700s, a factory built by Europeans later on, and a chaukidar's fort. Uncha Tila was the site of the tehsil headquarters when Sandi was originally selected as a tehsil by the British, although it was later moved to Bilgram. Nawabganj was the site of the main bazaar in Sandi; smaller ones  were held at Khalisa, Auladganj, Munshiganj, and Salamullahganj. 

The population of Sandi declined somewhat in the late 1800s, from 11,123 people in 1872 to 9,072 in 1901.

Demographics

As of the 2001 Census of India, Sandi had a population of 12.607. Males constitute 54% of the population and females 46%. Sandi has an average literacy rate of 81%, higher than the national average of 74%: male literacy is 86%, and female literacy is 71%. In Sandi, 17% of the population is under 6 years of age.

As of 2011, the population of Sandi is 26,007, in 4,396 households. Of this, 3,815 (%) is age 0-6. Its sex ratio is 905 females to 1000 males. Among the 0-6 age group, the ratio is 949. The overall literacy rate is 67.65%, including 73.63% among males and 60.97% among females.

Economy
As of 1971, the economy of Sandi was described as a mix of primary activities along with commercial and industrial sectors, with primary activities being the largest category. The main items imported were coal, kerosene oil, and cotton. The main items manufactured were groundnut oil, mustard oil, and power threshers. The biggest exports were grains, potatoes, and groundnut oil.

Sandi Bird Sanctuary
Sandi Bird Sanctuary is located at a distance of 19 km on Hardoi-Sandi Road in Hardoi district of Uttar Pradesh. Sandi Bird Sanctuary is 1 km. from Sandi town on Main Road, Nawabganj, near Sandi Police Station Sandi (Hardoi). 
Sandi Bird sanctuary was developed in the year 1990 in view to protect the natural habitats and aquatic vegetation for the local residents and migratory birds. The Sandi Bird sanctuary is also known by its ancient name as "Dahar Jheel" (Jheel = Lake). The lake is spread over 3.0854 km2 area. 
River Garra earlier named as Garun Ganga also located near the sanctuary. 
Migratory birds rest for sometime in the river front before reaching to Sandi Bird sanctuary. The migratory birds start coming at the beginning of winter in the month of November.

As a tourist destination, Sandi is a paradise for bird lovers and is an ideal place for those who want to explore nature. The best time to visit the sanctuary is from December to February. The nearest railway station is at Hardoi (19 km). 
From several years the lake was about to dry but after many efforts the lake get its breath again

Villages 
Sandi CD block has the following 120 villages:

References

Many battles between the Mogul and Afghan empires took place in town Sandi due to the situation of the town. Humayun was defeated by Sher Shah Suri between the cities of Bilgram and Sandi, and he escaped by crossing the river Ganges with the help of a bhisti to whom he had made the king for one day after regaining the throne.

Cities and towns in Hardoi district